Exposed is a 1938 American drama film starring Glenda Farrell, Otto Kruger and Herbert Mundin. The film was directed by Harold D. Schuster and is based on George R. Bilson's unpublished story "Candid Camera Girl". It was released by Universal Pictures on November 4, 1938. A magazine photo-newswoman tried to make amends after exposing a lawyer and complication ensues when they fall in love.

Plot
Click Stewart (Glenda Farrell) is a magazine photographer. She is told by her editor Steve Conway (Charles D. Brown) to find an exclusive story for the magazine. Click discovers that a former lawyer William Reardon (Otto Kruger) who disappeared several years before is now living on the street. When the story and her photos are published, William Reardon sued the magazine. Click decides to meet with William and asks him to dismiss the lawsuit. William explains to Click that he quit his law practice after convicting an innocent man and sending him to the electric chair. William agrees to drop the lawsuit when Click offers to find the man's daughter and make restitution. Click learns that the man's daughter died in a car accident and persuades Betty Clarke, her actress roommate to pretend to be the man's daughter.

William meets Betty and drops his lawsuit, with the story making the newspaper headline. However, Mike Romero (Bernard Nedell) who works for a gangster named Tony Mitchell (Richard Lane) knows the truth and decides to blackmail Betty. Click plans to expose Tony Mitchell's protection racket. William who is now working as a lawyer again is helping Click. They plan to gather enough evidence of Mike's illegal activity to arrest him, with William and Click falling in love at the same time. When William learns that the man's real daughter is actually dead, he confronts Click who is talking to Tony Mitchell. William recognizes Tony as the person who framed the man he convicted. Later, William reconciles with Click and successfully prosecutes Tony and his man.

Cast

Glenda Farrell as 'Click' Stewart
Otto Kruger as William Reardon
Herbert Mundin as Skippy
Charles D. Brown as Steve Conway
Richard Lane as Tony Mitchell
Lorraine Krueger as Betty Clarke
Bernard Nedell as Mike Romero
David Oliver as Tim
Lester Dorr as Slim (uncredited)

Reception
Frank S.Nugent of The New York Times writes in his movie review: "Flash is not only the name of a picture magazine for which Glenda Farrell makes sensational photographs in a film called "Exposed," now at the Rialto. It is also the impossible space of time in which much of the important action coincidentally happens therein. For just with the innocent snapshot of a presumed Bowery bum Miss Farrell and her magazine set in motion a train of rapid-fire events which culminate in the round-up of a gang of racketeers, the regeneration of a demoralized lawyer and the tinkle of wedding bells. In short, "Exposed" is just another of those headlong reportorial melodramas which pause neither for breath, explanations nor a moment's cool reflection. It is not very true to Life."

References

External links
Exposed at Internet Movie Database

1938 films
Films directed by Harold D. Schuster
Universal Pictures films
1938 drama films
American drama films
American black-and-white films
1930s English-language films
1930s American films